In cooking, a leavening agent or raising agent, also called a leaven or leavener, is any one of a number of substances used in doughs and batters that cause a foaming action (gas bubbles) that lightens and softens the mixture. An alternative or supplement to leavening agents is mechanical action by which air is incorporated (i.e. kneading). Leavening agents can be biological or synthetic chemical compounds. The gas produced is often carbon dioxide, or occasionally hydrogen.

When a dough or batter is mixed, the starch in the flour and the water in the dough form a matrix (often supported further by proteins like gluten or polysaccharides, such as pentosans or xanthan gum). The starch then gelatinizes and sets, leaving gas bubbles that remain.

Biological leavening agents 
 Saccharomyces cerevisiae producing carbon dioxide found in:
 baker's yeast
 Beer barm (unpasteurised—live yeast)
 ginger beer
 kefir
 sourdough starter
 Clostridium perfringens producing hydrogen found in salt-rising bread

Chemical leavening agents 
Chemical leavens are mixtures or compounds that release gases when they react with each other, with moisture, or with heat.  Most are based on a combination of acid (usually a low molecular weight organic acid) and a salt of bicarbonate .  After they act, these compounds leave behind a chemical salt.  Chemical leavens are used in quick breads and cakes, as well as cookies and numerous other applications where a long biological fermentation is impractical or undesirable.

History
Chemical leavening using pearl ash as a leavening agent was mentioned by Amelia Simmons in her American Cookery, published in 1796.

Since chemical expertise is required to create a functional chemical leaven without producing off-flavors from the chemical precursors involved, such substances are often mixed into premeasured combinations for maximum results. These are generally referred to as baking powders.  Sour milk and carbonates were used in the 1800s.  The breakthrough in chemical leavening agents occurred in the 1930s with the introduction of monocalcium phosphates . Other leavening agents developed include sodium aluminium sulfate , disodium pyrophosphate , and sodium aluminium phosphates .  These compounds combine with sodium bicarbonate to give carbon dioxide in a predictable manner.

Other leavens 
Steam and air are used as leavening agents when they expand upon heating. To take advantage of this style of leavening, the baking must be done at high enough temperatures to flash the water to steam, with a batter that is capable of holding the steam in until set. This effect is typically used in popovers, Yorkshire puddings, and to a lesser extent in tempura.

Mechanical leavening 

Creaming is the process of beating sugar crystals and solid fat (typically butter) together in a mixer.  This integrates tiny air bubbles into the mixture, since the sugar crystals physically cut through the structure of the fat. Creamed mixtures are usually further leavened by a chemical leaven like baking soda. This is often used in cookies.

Using a whisk on certain liquids, notably cream or egg whites, can also create foams through mechanical action. This is the method employed in the making of sponge cakes, where an egg protein matrix produced by vigorous whipping provides almost all the structure of the finished product.

The Chorleywood bread process uses a mix of biological and mechanical leavening to produce bread; while it is considered by food processors to be an effective way to deal with the soft wheat flours characteristic of British Isles agriculture, it is controversial due to a perceived lack of quality in the final product. The process has nevertheless been adapted by industrial bakers in other parts of the world.

See also

 Aerated Bread Company, bakeries started in 1862 in the UK that made carbon dioxide leavened bread 
 Baking powder
 Chametz
 Parable of the Leaven
 Passover
 Unleavened bread

References

Further reading 
 Matz, S (1972). "Bakery Technology and Engineering", AVI Publishing Co.

External links 

 Wikibooks Cookbook has a recipe/module on Leavening agent

 
Fermentation in food processing